"I'm with Stupid" is a song by English synth-pop duo Pet Shop Boys from their ninth studio album, Fundamental (2006). It was released on 8 May 2006 as the album's lead single. It became the duo's 21st top-10 single in the United Kingdom, peaking at number 8.

Meaning
Though ostensibly about a romantic relationship with a man perceived by the public as a "moron", the song has been acknowledged as being, on another level, about Tony Blair's beleaguered "special relationship" with George W. Bush. The protagonist of the song is eventually brought to wonder if the other's stupidity might not be a front:

Is stupid really this stupid
or a different kind of smart?
Do we really have a relationship
so special in your heart?

Release and performances
The song charted at number eight on the UK Singles Chart, becoming the duo's 21st UK top-10 single. One of the single's B-sides, "The Resurrectionist", in keeping with the group's fondness for unusual historical subject matter in their songs, is about body-snatching in the English Regency era, carried out by people literally called "resurrectionists".

Remixers of the single include Melnyk, Max Tundra, Abe Duque and Pet Shop Boys themselves. Several of the official remixes were not released on physical media at all, being exclusively available on iTunes Music Store and other online music stores. In addition, the single has yet to be released in any form in the United States.

"I'm with Stupid" was performed on the 23 April 2006 episode of Top of the Pops, in the latest in a long series of Pet Shop Boys performances on the UK music programme. The performance was planned to include six dancers, wearing masks depicting Blair's and Bush's faces. The BBC's editorial department objected, however, citing the need to be politically "impartial"; in the end, only one Blair mask and one Bush mask was used, with the remaining four masks replaced by ones depicting Bill Clinton, David Cameron, Menzies Campbell, and Vladimir Putin.
The song was later performed in Germany in the form the BBC had objected to.

Music video
The video, filmed at Alexandra Palace in North London features David Walliams and Matt Lucas of Little Britain.

In the video, the duo stage a performance in which they play the roles of Tennant and Lowe and mime "I'm with Stupid" while dressed in Very-era outfits (mainly from the "Can You Forgive Her?" and "Go West" promotional campaigns). They are accompanied by a group of dancers, also dressed in similar costumes.

The video ends with Walliams and Lucas asking for the approval of the audience, which is revealed to be Tennant and Lowe themselves, bound to their seats.

Track listings
UK CD single (CDR6690)
"I'm with Stupid" – 3:27
"The Resurrectionist" – 3:12

UK 7-inch picture disc (R6690)
A. "I'm with Stupid" – 3:27
B. "Girls Don't Cry" – 2:35

UK DVD single (DVDR6690)
"I'm with Stupid" – 3:27
"The Resurrectionist" (Goetz B. Extended Mix) – 5:40
"Girls Don't Cry" – 2:35
"I'm with Stupid" (video) – 3:58

European CD single (362 8482)
"I'm with Stupid" – 3:27
"The Resurrectionist" – 3:12

European CD maxi single (362 8552)
"I'm with Stupid" – 3:27
"The Resurrectionist" (Goetz B. Extended Mix) – 5:40
"Girls Don't Cry" – 2:35

European DVD single (362 7889)
"I'm with Stupid" – 3:27
"The Resurrectionist" (Goetz B. Extended Mix) – 5:40
"Girls Don't Cry" – 2:35
"I'm with Stupid" (video) – 3:58
"I'm with Stupid" (making of)

Charts

Release history

References

2006 singles
2006 songs
Parlophone singles
Pet Shop Boys songs
Song recordings produced by Trevor Horn
Songs about George W. Bush
Songs written by Chris Lowe
Songs written by Neil Tennant